EuroVelo 2 (EV2), named The Capitals Route, is a  long EuroVelo long-distance cycling route running from Galway, Ireland to Moscow, Russia. This east-west route passes successively through seven countries – Ireland, the United Kingdom, the Netherlands, Germany, Poland, Belarus and Russia – and visits all their capital cities.

Route

In Ireland

The route is known as the Dublin-Galway Greenway, and is yet to be finalised.

The western section of EV2 between Galway and Dublin was scheduled to commence construction between Athlone and Mullingar in 2014, and completed in 2015, along a disused railway line. Portions of the Royal Canal bank between Mullingar and the Westmeath – Meath county boundary have been completed. The section from the county boundary – Dublin section closed public consultation in February 2016 The initial design of the westernmost section through Galway and Roscommon has been rejected as substandard and must be redesigned.

Note that there is some controversy over the design standard in Ireland overall.

In the UK 

In the UK, the EV2 starts at Holyhead on the Isle of Anglesey and travels through the heart of Wales along the National Cycle Network's NCR8 Lôn Las Cymru, taking in Snowdonia National Park and Brecon Beacons National Park. It passes through the Welsh capital of Cardiff before crossing the Severn, where it visits the cities of Bristol and Bath – connected by the  Bristol and Bath Railway Path.

After that it joins the Kennet and Avon Cycle Route (NCR4) along the canal which links the Thames and the Bristol Channel, weaving through scenery on its way from Bath to Reading. At Reading, the route joins the Thames Path Cycle Route on its way to London. Finally it leaves London through the docklands, travelling north to the ferry port at Harwich.

In the Netherlands 
In the Netherlands, the EV2 follows the Dutch National Cycle Routes LF4 & LF8. From The Hague it follows the LF4 to Borculo and then the LF8 to Zwillbrock on the German border.

In Germany 

In Germany, the EV2 follows the German Cycling Network's D-Route 3, which runs  from the Dutch border at Vreden to the Polish one at Küstrin-Kietz.

In Poland 
In Poland, the EV2 exists from the German border to Poznań. The rest is currently in development.

In Belarus 
In Belarus, it will go through the last great (largely-unchanged) primeval forest in Europe, the Białowieża Forest, and the capital Minsk.

In Russia 
In Russia, the EV2 is in the planning stages and will pass through Smolensk on its way to Moscow.

See also

EuroVelo
National Cycle Network
Dutch National Cycle Routes
German Cycling Network

References

External links

EuroVelo
Cycleways in the United Kingdom
Cycleways in the Netherlands
Cycleways in Germany
Cycleways in Poland
Cycleways in Belarus
Cycleways in Russia